Lim Nam-kyu (born 1 September 1989) is a South Korean luger. Lim is competing at the 2018 Winter Olympics for South Korea.

References

External links
 
 
 
 
 

1989 births
Living people
South Korean male lugers
Olympic lugers of South Korea
Lugers at the 2018 Winter Olympics
Lugers at the 2022 Winter Olympics
Yong In University alumni